Baz Mohammad Ahmadi (Ahmady) is the Deputy Minister of Interior for Counter-Narcotics and the former Governor of Badakhshan, in Afghanistan. He used to be Governor of Ghor Province.  Ahmadi is an ethnic Tajik and was a mid-level commander in the Jamiat Islami military alliance under Ahmed Shah Massoud that fought in the civil wars that dominated Afghanistan after the withdrawal of Soviet occupation forces in the early 1990s.  After the American-led invasion of 2001, Ahmadi became a high-ranking Afghan defense department functionary, including a posting as Ismail Khan's replacement as military commander of Herat Province.

Ahmadi has been accused of human rights violations by Human Rights Watch due to his actions in the post-Soviet conflict.

References

Year of birth missing (living people)
Living people
Afghan Tajik people
Jamiat-e Islami politicians
Governors of Badakhshan Province
Governors of Ghor Province